Lamas District is one of eleven districts of the province Lamas in Peru.

References